was a Japanese illustrator and painter, known for his erotic works.

Life 
Saeki was born in Miyazaki Prefecture and grew up in Osaka from the age of four. Little is known about his family background and the rest of his private life. Saeki deliberately avoided the public eye because, in his opinion, this allowed him to be freer and more provocative in his art.

He studied Western painting in Kyōto from 1960 and then worked as an advertising designer in Osaka from 1963 to 1966. He gave up this job to travel the world. He traveled to Europe, the Soviet Union and the Middle East, among other places. From 1969, Saeki lived in Tokyo. The 1970s also saw an increasingly open approach to sexuality in Japan. However, Toshio Saeki was not active in the sex club scene, despite his genre. He also had no models, but usually painted from his head. He said in an interview:In the late 1980s, Saeki moved away from the Tokyo metropolis and from then on lived and worked in his studio in the rural Chiba Prefecture. Saeki left Japan only once throughout his life. Saeki died on November 21, 2019, but his death was not announced until January 2020.

Work 
Toshio Saeki was interested in Western art. An important inspiration for him was the Frenchman Tomi Ungerer.  Saeki's works often depict sexuality and brutality in a very explicit way, combining traditional Shunga and Yōkai styles with elements of Western art.

During his Tokyo period, his publications included the book Saeki Toshio Gashū (佐伯俊男画集) in 1970, and some of his sketches appeared in the men's magazine Heibon Punch (平凡パンチ). Also in 1970, a solo exhibition was held in Paris at Gare Saint-Lazare , but his originals were stolen. These publications and exhibitions drew growing public interest to him. The cover of John Lennon and Yoko Ono's 1972 album Some Time in New York City features a drawing by Saeki of a devil-like figure attacking a young woman in school uniform with a knife. 1979 saw the release of the short film Demain la petite fille sera en retard à l'école by Michel Boschet, which was based on Saeki's drawings and won the César for Best Animated Short Film the following year. Toshio Saeki has had exhibitions in San Francisco, Tel Aviv, Toronto, and Taipei, among others, as well as at Art Basel Hong Kong

Selected exhibitions 

 2019: Banshou Kaiki – Toshio Saeki Works Exhibition, Jiu Xiang Ju Gallery, Taipei, Taiwan
 2016: SELECTED WORKS 1972–2016, Narwhal, Toronto, Canada
 2016: Toshio Saeki Print Exhibition, Kartel, Tel Aviv, Israel
 2014: TOSHIO SAEKI, AISHONANZUKA, Hong Kong
 2010: Toshio Saeki Early Works, 111minnagallery, San Francisco, USA
 2009: ONIKAGE, Span Art Gallery, Tokyo
 2006: Saeki Toshio 70, Kyōto and Tokyo
 1999: Yumemanji, Span Art Gallery, Tokyo
 1985: Toshio Saeki Solo Exhibit, Gray Box Gallery, San José, USA
 1971: Akaihako, Gallery Décor, Tokyo
 1970: Toshio Saeki Book Release Solo Exhibit, Paris, France

References 

2019 deaths
1945 births
Japanese painters
Japanese illustrators
People from Miyazaki Prefecture
Japanese erotic artists